Ian Johnson (born 7 March 1983 in Liverpool) is an English football midfielder. He is the grandson of former Liverpool player Ronnie Moran.

Playing career
Johnson started his career at Wigan Athletic. He made his debut for the club on 9 January 2001 in a 3–2 away win against Oldham Athletic in the Football League Trophy, and made a further appearance in the next round of the competition in a 2–1 defeat against Walsall. He signed a one-year professional contract with the club at the end of the season, but failed to make a first-team appearance during the following season and was released in April 2002. He then joined Southport, where he made one appearance in the Liverpool Senior Cup, scoring in a 3–1 win against Prescot Cables. He was released, however, in March 2003 without making a single league appearance for the club. He then signed for Marine, playing seven times and scoring once, before joining Burscough in March 2004.

After a good first season with the club, in which he scored six goals, Johnson suffered a cruciate ligament injury, keeping him out for most of the following season.

He played a number of games for Clitheroe.

In 2008, he signed for newly formed A.F.C. Liverpool, where he played 14 times and scored twice during the 2008–09 season.

Coaching and management career
Johnson was assistant manager at Clitheroe to Simon Haworth between 2016 and April 2018 and returned to Marine Football Club in May 2018, when he was named as manager Tommy Lawson's new assistant.  He was made caretaker manager of the club in September 2018 after Lawson's resignation. Later that month Neil Young was appointed manager and he became first team coach. Johnson moved on to Stalybridge Celtic as Assistant Manager in June 2020, leaving the club in September 2021.  He returned to Marine in December 2021 as Head of Scouting.

References

External links

1983 births
Living people
Footballers from Liverpool
English footballers
Association football midfielders
Wigan Athletic F.C. players
Southport F.C. players
Marine F.C. players
Burscough F.C. players
A.F.C. Liverpool players
North West Counties Football League players
Marine F.C. non-playing staff
Marine F.C. managers
Clitheroe F.C. players